CricHQ is a digital platform for sport which combines competition management and administration software with live scoring and statistics for cricket clubs. It is based in Wellington, New Zealand, and was set up by CEO Simon Baker and former New Zealand cricketers Stephen Fleming and Brendon McCullum. It manages the administration of cricket test countries New Zealand, Sri Lanka, South Africa and Zimbabwe. A number of other national governing bodies also use its services from club level upwards (see National Governing Bodies section below).

The company provides a range of digital services to cricket organisations that typically use paper-based administration and scoring. The services include instant updates for fans, performance insights for coaches and the ability to set up cricket-related social networks. It also makes it easier to register players, organise competition draws and analyse demographics of sport participants.

When the app was launched it was briefly one of the world's most downloaded sporting apps  and since then it has amassed over 1 million Facebook fans.

The company has been described as "one of New Zealand’s largely unsung tech success stories" by one of New Zealand's leading technology journalists.

In October 2016, CricHQ's then-Executive Chair, Mike Loftus, was invited to visit India with New Zealand's Prime Minister, John Key, as part of a trade delegation.

In December 2016, former Saatchi & Saatchi Chair and CEO Kevin Roberts was appointed as Chair of CricHQ's board.

In October 2017, CricHQ was put in voluntary receivership by majority shareholders Tembusu Partners who appointed insolvency experts KordaMentha to sell the business. CricHQ was purchased by a group of private investors and continues to trade.

Video content 
In 2017, CricHQ acquired My Action Replay, a sportstech company based in Bristol. My Action Replay provides cameras and the capability for sports teams to livestream their games and to package up highlights to be hosted online. With CricHQ's customer base, the acquisition of My Action Replay could make CricHQ the largest broadcaster of cricket in the world.

Investment 
In June 2015 CricHQ raised US$10m from Singapore private equity firm Tembusu Partners to expand globally including a doubling of staff in India, the world's largest cricketing nation.

In September 2016 it was revealed that CricHQ was seeking further investment of US$10M and was in discussions with investment bankers in the United States and United Kingdom. It also stated that the company was valued at US$70M while forecast to make a loss of more than US$4m in the 2016/17 financial year.

Incoming Chair Kevin Roberts (businessman) revealed that he had invested a "seven figure" sum in the company in December 2016.

National Governing Bodies 

As well as having a partnership with the International Cricket Council, CricHQ signed Hong Kong as its 50th cricketing National Governing Body in August 2016. As of May 2017, 54 National Governing Bodies have been signed. The full list of National Governing Bodies that CricHQ has signed with is:

 New Zealand
 South Africa
 Sri Lanka
 Zimbabwe
 Afghanistan
 Belgium
 Botswana
 Canada
 France
 Germany
 Gibraltar
 Guernsey
 Ireland
 Japan
 Jersey
 Namibia
 Nepal
 Papua New Guinea
 Scotland
 Singapore
 UAE
 USA
 Vanuatu
 Zambia
 Austria
 Chile
 Cook Islands
 Cyprus
 Estonia
 Finland
 Hungary
 Indonesia
 Malawi
 Maldives
 Malta
 Mexico
 Norway
 Oman
 Philippines
 Portugal
 Russia
 Sierra Leone
 Taiwan
 Vietnam
 Czech Republic
 Nigeria
 Brazil
 Qatar
 Rwanda
 Hong Kong
 Trinidad & Tobago

Awards 

 In May 2017, CricHQ won the Best-Integrated Digital Media award at the Sports Technology Awards, a global award recognising the best in Sports Tech in the world 
 In March 2017, CricHQ was shortlisted as a finalist in the UK Sports Technology Awards in the Best-Integrated Digital Media category.
 In September 2016, CricHQ was announced as a finalist in the New Zealand Innovation Awards in the Innovation in technology solutions section and as the Emerging New Zealand innovator. CricHQ was highly commended in the Emerging Innovator award 
 In July 2016, CricHQ won the Excellence in Software Award at the New Zealand Excellence in IT Awards.
 CricHQ was awarded a National Award for Excellence in Digital Marketing & Social Media at the 2016 CMO Asia Awards for its #ICareISupport campaign to help raise money for drought-stricken farmers in Maharashtra.

References

External links
 Company home page

New Zealand sport websites
Cricket websites
Companies based in Wellington